Edmund Bacon Fitzgerald (1926 – August 28, 2013) was an American business executive from Wisconsin and was a key figure in bringing major league baseball back to Milwaukee in the form of the Milwaukee Brewers in 1970.

Early life and education
Fitzgerald was born in 1926 in Milwaukee, Wisconsin. He attended the Milwaukee Country Day School, the Deerfield Academy and the University of Michigan. He served in the United States Marine Corps from 1943 to 1946 and from 1950 to 1952.

Endeavors

Business endeavors
Fitzgerald served as chief executive officer of Cutler-Hammer, Inc. for 15 years. During the 1980s, he was chairman and CEO of Nortel. He was also director of the Business Council on National Issues in Canada for four years.  He also served on the board of trustees for Northwestern Mutual Life Insurance Company, First Wisconsin National Bank and Beloit College.

Baseball endeavors
Fitzgerald co-founded the Milwaukee Brewers in 1970, serving at various times as Vice President and General Partner on the club until 1982. During the 1970s, he was on the Executive Council of Major League Baseball and chairman of its Player Relations Committee. He was previously a director on the board of the Milwaukee Braves and opposed the move

Political and other endeavors
Fitzgerald served as Industry Advisory Council to the U.S. Department of Defense and was President of the National Electrical Manufacturers Association. He served on President Ronald Reagan's National Security Telecommunications Advisory Committee and was a life trustee and chairman on the Committee for Economic Development. Due to his efforts to improve trade relations between the United States and Japan, Fitzgerald was awarded the Order of the Rising Sun, 2nd Class. He also served as a member of the U.S.-Korea Wisemen Council.

Family
Fitzgerald's father, also named Edmund Fitzgerald (1895–1986), was a civic leader who served as chairman of the Northwestern Mutual Life Insurance Company, and was the namesake for the Great Lakes freighter SS Edmund Fitzgerald, popularized in the 1976 song "The Wreck of the Edmund Fitzgerald" by Gordon Lightfoot. His grandfather, William E. Fitzgerald (1859–1901), was a famous shipbuilder, and his maternal grandfather Frank R. Bacon (1872–1949) co-founded Cutler-Hammer.

References

External links

1926 births
2013 deaths
Businesspeople from Milwaukee
Military personnel from Milwaukee
University of Michigan alumni